Nike Crowns the Hero (German: Nike krönt den Sieger) is an outdoor 1853 sculpture by Friedrich Drake, installed on Schlossbrücke in Berlin, Germany.

References

External links

 

1853 establishments in Germany
1853 sculptures
Outdoor sculptures in Berlin
Sculptures of Nike
Sculptures of men in Germany
Statues in Germany